Skateboarding is not a crime is a slogan advocating for the right of anyone to enjoy skateboarding.

In 1987 skateboard company Powell Peralta initiated an advertising campaign using "skateboarding is not a crime" as their slogan. Their 1988 advertising video, Public Domain, showed skateboarders in various locations which displayed stickers showing the slogan.

In 1997 skateboard company NHS, Inc. began formal use of the slogan for their brand.

Various commentators in the skateboarding community have discussed what the phrase means to them.

Skateboarding at the 2020 Summer Olympics raised the profile of the sport, leading commentators to reflect on how skateboarding has been called a crime but now people take it more seriously.

The phrase has been used to advertise skateparks in locations where skateboarding is encouraged. It has also been used for the opposite to explain where skateboarding is discouraged.

References

Further consideration
Public Domain by Powell Peralta, the first use of the slogan
Skateboarding is not a crime by Skate Inc
SKATEBOARDING IS NOT A CRIME | A Dramatic Reenactment by The Berrics

Skateboarding mass media
Slogans